Jonathan Eysseric and Édouard Roger-Vasselin were the defending champions but only Eysseric chose to defend his title, partnering Andre Begemann. Eysseric successfully defended his title, defeating Tomasz Bednarek and David Pel 6–3, 6–4 in the final.

Seeds

Draw

References
 Main Draw

Internationaux de Tennis de Vendée - Doubles
2017 Doubles